"This Bar" is a song co-written and recorded by American country artist Morgan Wallen. The song was co-written with Hardy, Jackson Morgan, Jake Scott, Ernest K. Smith, and Ryan Vojtesak. It was the second promotional single from Wallen's sophomore album Dangerous: The Double Album.

Background
Prior to the song's official release, Wallen occasionally performed "This Bar" as part of his live show. The track was officially released on New Year's Eve in 2019. Wallen stated: "Wrote this song with my buddies about some moments and times in my life that have made me who I am today. Some good, some bad, but all of em I can look back on and grin a little".

Critical reception
Lauren Hoffman of Taste of Country called the song a "feel-good track" and a "refreshing take on what we can learn from our experiences" Jon Freeman of Rolling Stone referred to it as "anthemic" noting Wallen's "impassioned vocals". Country Music Tattletale described the song as a "nostalgic tip-of-the-hat to late nights and locales".

Commercial performance
"This Bar" peaked at number 29 on Billboard Hot Country Songs for the week of January 18, 2020. It entered the Hot 100 in the United States at number 92 and the Canadian Hot 100 at number 81 for the week of January 23, 2021 following the release of Wallen's album. It has been certified Platinum by Music Canada.

Charts

Weekly charts

Year-end charts

Certifications

Release history

References

2019 songs
Morgan Wallen songs
Songs written by Hardy (singer)
Songs written by Morgan Wallen
Song recordings produced by Joey Moi
Songs written by Ernest (musician)